Mareen Duvall (1625–1694) was a French Huguenot and an early American settler.

Background
Mareen Duvall was born in 1625, in Nantes, France and was originally named Marin Duval. On August 28, 1650, Duvall emigrated to the English colony of Maryland.

Eventually, he received a patent for La Val from the Calvert family which was the first proprietors of colonial Maryland. It was possible that he named the family estate after the county of Laval, an independent county created in the 15th century. This property was on the south side the South River in Anne Arundel County, Maryland. He became quite prosperous and his Middle Plantation in Davidsonville, Maryland and La Val were "as luxurious and courtly as any of the manors of the English gentry."

He died in 1694 and left his substantial estate (which included at least 18 slaves) to Mary Stanton, his third and final wife. Then, she administrated said estate. Duvall had purchased sizeable tracts of land, including Catton which was later known as Belair, as well as the Middle Plantation in Davidsonville, Maryland. Combined, he owned several thousand acres in the counties of Anne Arundel and Prince George. Scholars believed that the location of the original house of Middle Plantation was somewhere along the Rutland Road.

In 1705, his son, John Duvall and his wife Mary deeded land to Queen Anne Parish to construct St. Barnabas Church.  Mareen Duvall's widow, Mary went on to marry Henry Ridgley (1635-1710). After Ridgley's death, she married Jacob Henderson.

Genealogy
Genealogies often refer to him as "the Emigrant" to distinguish him from several descendants also named Mareen Duvall. His notable descendants include Harry S. Truman, Barack Obama, Dick Cheney, Wallis Simpson, and Robert Duvall.

Other descendants include Warren Buffett, former Associate Justice Gabriel Duvall, Confederate General Bradley Tyler Johnson and spy Betty Duvall.

See also

 Colonial families of Maryland

References

Further reading 
William P. Doepkins, Excavations at Mareen Duvall's Middle Plantation of South River Hundred (Baltimore: Gateway Press, 1991)

External links 
 Duvall Society
 A Partial Listing of Descendants of Mareen Duvall "the Emigrant"
 Duvall family tree, by Ron Ulrich.
  Mareen Duvall's Genealogy Page
 Family Group Sheet for Mareen DUVALL
 Cheney, Obama 'distant cousins', BBC, 17 October 2007

1625 births
1694 deaths
17th-century French people
M
French emigrants to the Thirteen Colonies
French slave owners
Huguenots
Obama family
People from Anne Arundel County, Maryland
American slave owners